Osijek Airport, commonly referred to as Klisa is the international airport of Osijek, Croatia. It is located 20 km east southeast of Osijek and is situated near the D2 state road, southwest of the village of Klisa.

Facilities

The terminal building, with area of 1300 m2, provides flow from 200 to 400 passengers per hour, i.e. 100,000 to 150,000 passengers per year. As an additional passenger service there is possibility for contracting individual charter flights. The passenger terminal is equipped to handle domestic and international traffic, it features passport and custom controls, passenger and baggage check-in, exchange, information, a café-bar and restaurant as well as rent a car, taxi and car parking services.

Cargo traffic
Osijek Airport is primarily constructed for cargo traffic, due to Croatia's favorable geographic and transport position. One of the examples is that the airport's apron can handle large freighter aircraft such as the B747 and A330.

In order to get Croatia included into European transport network, government and local authorities are investing and developing transport infrastructure and combined transport activities: road and railroad network, international waterway, the Drava, with the cargo port and Osijek Airport.

The complex traffic Corridor Vc (road, railway, and river and air traffic) which connects Northern, Central and Southern Europe represents an opportunity to integrate economic development and traffic movement into the Central European area. It is opportunity – for all economic areas, such as manufacturers, distributors, as it for Osijek Airport.

Čepin airfield
There is also a secondary airfield, used exclusively for sport and private flying purposes. Located South-West of the city centre, it is called Čepin and has ICAO code LDOC. It is also used for exhibitions. When Pope John Paul II visited Croatia, this was the place where the service was held. Also, the annual car-show is held here.

Airlines and destinations
The following airlines operate regular scheduled and charter flights at Osijek Airport:

Statistics

References

External links

 Official website

Airports in Croatia
Airports established in 1980
Airport
Buildings and structures in Osijek-Baranja County